Chahar Bagh (also Romanized as Chahār Bāgh) is a village in Estarabad-e Jonubi Rural District, in the Central District of Gorgan County, Golestan Province, Iran. At the 2006 census, its population was 205, in 75 families.

References 

Populated places in Gorgan County